Sultana Siddiqui also known as Sultana Apa (Sindhi: سلطانا آپي)is a Pakistani media mogul, television director, and producer  who is the founder of Hum Network Limited.

Siddiqui is an active director of Hum Network Limited and the president of Hum Network Limited. 
By virtue of that she became the first woman in Pakistan to establish a TV station quite successfully in a matchless mode and was awarded Sitara-e-Imtiaz for the same in 2021 by the President of Pakistan.

Personal life
She was born in Hyderabad, Sindh, into a Siddiqui family domiciled therein, one of ten children. She received her early education from government schools in Hyderabad.

Career 
Sultana started her career from PTV as a producer in Karachi in 1974. In 2004 she founded Eye Television Network, now known as "Hum Network Limited" under which her own four cable channels are working, including "Hum TV". Under her direction HUM TV has received Pakistan's Lux Style Awards four years in a row. She is the only woman in Asia who started or owned a TV channel.

As a director she remained inactive ten years before her latest drama serial Zindagi Gulzar Hai, a critically acclaimed serial that has been praised for "breaking the ice across the borders of Pakistan and India in current times" featuring Fawad Khan and Sanam Saeed. Siddiqui has also produced children's television, musical performances, television films, serials and documentaries.

As a public speaker, Sultana has spoken on many local and international platforms, including the 2013 US Islamic World Forum held in Doha, Qatar and the 2014 Women Leadership Forum held in Silicon Valley, California.

Sultana has won numerous awards, including the Best Producer of a Drama Serial, Best Producer of a Music Production, the Hazrat Khadijat ul Kubra Award, Women of Vision Award, Nigar Award, the Gold Medal Award, Sindh Graduates Association Award, and the Pride of Performance Award from the Government of Pakistan. Her work is well known for its attention to social issues and its focus on female empowerment. Siddiqui has represented Pakistan in numerous international workshops and seminars.

In 2014, Sultana Siddiqui was awarded the "Leadership Award 2014" by CEO Club & Manager Today Magazine, recognising her work as a "true entrepreneur and leader of Pakistan who is steering the nation and nurturing the upcoming generation with hope and professionalism". During this year Sultana Siddiqui was also featured in the best-selling book, "100 Performing CEOs & Leaders of Pakistan".

In January 2015, Sultana Siddiqui was recognised for the contribution to the entertainment industry with the Scroll of Honour award at the 5th GR8! Women Awards held in Dubai. The awards ceremony is held every year by the Indian Television Academy to celebrate the contributions made by women in various fields, including art, cinema, environment, entrepreneurship and education.

Siddiqui founded the Karachi Film Society (KFS) in 2017. The nonprofit society hosts seminars, workshops, and festivals to promote film and drive the Pakistani film industry in new and creative ways. KFS is also the parent body of the Pakistan International Film Festival (PIFF).

In 2018 Sultana Siddiqui collaborated with Zac Ch. from the University of The Arts London to produce the first set of books on Pakistani Fashion to be held in a major western Arts university library.  The books are titled Fashion Uncovered and are an introduction to Pakistani Fashion.

Television 

 Anjaane Raaste – Producer
 Aur Zindagi Badalti Hai – Producer
 Dil Da Mamla – Director
 Doosri Dunya – Director
 Janat – Producer
 Marvi – Director
 Qismat Ke Sitaray – Director
 Sassi Punno – Director
 Shayad Kay Bahar Aaye – Producer
 Thori Si Mohabbat – Director
 Wafa Kay Mausam – Producer
 Yeh Zindagi – Director
 Zara Si Aurat – Director
 Zindagi Gulzar Hai – Director – 2012–2013

References

External links 
 
 
 Sultana Siddiqui at nettv4u

Living people
Sindhi people
Businesspeople from Karachi
Pakistani television directors
Pakistani television producers
Pakistani company founders
Hum TV people
Recipients of the Pride of Performance
Women business executives
Women television producers
Women television journalists
Year of birth missing (living people)
Pakistan Television Corporation people
Recipients of Sitara-i-Imtiaz
Women television directors